Crooked Creek is a census-designated place in Putnam County, Georgia, United States. Its population was 685 as of the 2020 census. The community is located on the western bank of the Oconee River.

Demographics

References

Populated places in Putnam County, Georgia
Census-designated places in Georgia (U.S. state)